Michael Clark Rockefeller (May 18, 1938 – presumed to have died November 19, 1961) was the fifth child of New York Governor and former U.S. Vice President Nelson Rockefeller. He was the grandson of American financier John D. Rockefeller Jr. and the great grandson of Standard Oil co-founder John D. Rockefeller. He disappeared during an expedition in the Asmat region of southwestern Netherlands New Guinea, which is now a part of the Indonesian province of Papua. In 2014, Carl Hoffman published a book that went into detail about the inquest into his killing, in which villagers and tribal elders admit to Rockefeller being killed after he swam to shore in 1961. No remains or physical proof of Rockefeller's death have been discovered.

Early life
Rockefeller was the fifth and last child of Mary Todhunter Rockefeller and Nelson Rockefeller. He was the third son of seven children fathered by Nelson Rockefeller, and he had a twin sister, Mary.

After attending The Buckley School in New York, and graduating from the Phillips Exeter Academy in New Hampshire, where he was a student senator and exceptional varsity wrestler, Rockefeller graduated cum laude from Harvard University with an A.B. in history and economics. In 1960, he served for six months as a private in the U.S. Army and then went on an expedition for Harvard's Peabody Museum of Archaeology and Ethnology to study the Dani tribe of western Netherlands New Guinea. The expedition filmed Dead Birds, an ethnographic documentary film produced by Robert Gardner, and for which Rockefeller was the sound recordist. Rockefeller and a friend briefly left the expedition to study the Asmat tribe of southern Netherlands New Guinea. After returning home from the Peabody expedition, Rockefeller returned to New Guinea to study the Asmat and collect Asmat art.

"It's the desire to do something adventurous," he explained, "at a time when frontiers, in the real sense of the word, are disappearing."

He spent his time in Netherlands New Guinea actively engaged with the culture and the art while recording ethnographic data. In one of his letters home he wrote:

I am having a thoroughly exhausting but most exciting time here ... The Asmat is like a huge puzzle with the variations in ceremony and art style forming the pieces. My trips are enabling me to comprehend (if only in a superficial, rudimentary manner) the nature of this puzzle ...

Disappearance
Their two local guides swam for help, but it was slow in coming.

After drifting for some time, early on November 19, 1961, Rockefeller said to Wassing: "I think I can make it." He then swam for shore. The boat was an estimated  from the shore when he made the attempt to swim to safety, supporting the theory that he died from exposure, exhaustion, or drowning.

Wassing was rescued the next day, but Rockefeller was never seen again, despite an intensive and lengthy search effort. At the time, Rockefeller's disappearance was a major world news item. His body has never been found.

Rockefeller was declared legally dead in 1964.

Speculation
It was originally reported that Rockefeller either drowned or was attacked by a shark or saltwater crocodile. However, because headhunting and cannibalism were still present in some areas of Asmat in 1961, there has also been speculation that Rockefeller may have been killed and eaten by tribespeople from the Asmat village of Otsjanep.

In 1969, the journalist Milt Machlin traveled to the island to investigate Rockefeller's disappearance. He dismissed reports of Rockefeller living as a captive or as a Kurtz-like figure in the jungle, but concluded that circumstantial evidence supported the idea that he had been killed. Several leaders of Otsjanep village, where Rockefeller likely would have arrived had he made it to shore, had been killed by a Dutch patrol in 1958, thus providing some rationale for revenge by the tribe against someone from the "white tribe". Neither cannibalism nor headhunting in Asmat were indiscriminate, but rather were part of a tit-for-tat revenge cycle, so it is possible that Rockefeller found himself the inadvertent victim of such a cycle. The incident is described in "Dance of the Warriors", the second volume of the documentary series Ring of Fire by the Blair brothers.

A book titled Rocky Goes West by author Paul Toohey claims that, in 1979, Rockefeller's mother hired a private investigator to go to New Guinea and try to resolve the mystery of his disappearance. The reliability of the story has been questioned, but Toohey claims that the private investigator swapped a boat engine for the skulls of the three men that a tribe claimed were the only white men they had ever killed. The investigator returned to New York and handed these skulls to the family, convinced that one of them was the skull of Rockefeller. If this event did actually occur, the family has never commented on it. However, the History Channel program Vanishings reported that Rockefeller's mother did pay a $250,000 reward to the investigator which was offered for final proof whether or not Michael Rockefeller was alive or dead.

In the documentary film Keep the River on Your Right, Tobias Schneebaum states that he spoke with some members of the Asmat village of Otsjanep who described finding Rockefeller on the riverside and eating him.

2014 book on disappearance
In 2014, Carl Hoffman published the book Savage Harvest: A Tale of Cannibals, Colonialism, and Michael Rockefeller's Tragic Quest for Primitive Art where he discusses researching Rockefeller's mysterious disappearance and presumed death. During multiple visits to the villages in the area, he heard several stories about men from Otsjanep killing Rockefeller after he swam to shore. The stories, which were similar to testimonials collected in the 1960s, center around a handful of men arguing and eventually deciding to kill Michael after he swam to shore, in revenge for a 1958 incident in which men from the village were killed in a confrontation with Dutch colonial officials. Soon after the murder, the villages were swept by a cholera epidemic and the villagers believed that it was retribution for killing Rockefeller. As Hoffman left one of the villages for the final time, he witnessed a man acting out a scene wherein someone was killed, and stopped to videotape it. When translated, the man was quoted as saying:

Don't you tell this story to any other man or any other village, because this story is only for us. Don't speak. Don't speak and tell the story. I hope you remember it and you must keep this for us. I hope. I hope. This is for you and you only. Don't talk to anyone, forever; to other people or another village. If people question you, don't answer. Don't talk to them, because this story is only for you. If you tell it to them, you'll die. I am afraid you will die. You'll be dead; your people will be dead, if you tell this story. You keep this story in your house; to yourself, I hope, forever. Forever. ...

Asmat artifacts and photographs
Many of the Asmat artifacts Rockefeller collected are part of the Michael C. Rockefeller Wing collection at the Metropolitan Museum of Art in New York City. The Peabody Museum has published the catalogue of an exhibition of pictures taken by Rockefeller during the New Guinea expedition.

In popular culture
The 1973, National Lampoon Comics contained a story (titled "New Guinea Pig") that focused on Rockefeller's disappearance as being a ruse so he could kill all the black people in New Guinea and his family could steal their resources.

Rockefeller's disappearance was the subject of episode #30 of In Search of ..., which originally aired January 21, 1978.

The band Guadalcanal Diary wrote a song about Rockefeller's disappearance called "Michael Rockefeller". The song appeared on their 1986 album Jamboree.

In the travel adventure book Ring of Fire: An Indonesian Odyssey, the Blair brothers claim to have discussed Rockefeller's death with a tribesman who killed him.

Christopher Stokes's short story "The Man Who Ate Michael Rockefeller", published in the 23rd issue of McSweeney's Quarterly Concern (Spring 2007), presents a fictional account of young Michael's demise.

The 2004 novel King of America by Samantha Gillison is loosely based on the life of Michael Rockefeller.

The 2007 film Welcome to the Jungle deals with two young couples who venture after Michael Rockefeller (thinking they can make a lot of money if they find evidence of Rockefeller), but meet grisly demises.

Jeff Cohen's play The Man Who Ate Michael Rockefeller, based on the short story by Christopher Stokes, had its world premiere in an Off Broadway production at the West End Theatre in New York. The play was directed by Alfred Preisser, and ran from September 10 to October 3, 2010.

In 2011, Agamemnon Films released a documentary titled The Search for Michael Rockefeller, based on journalist Milt Machlin's book of the same name released in 1974. In his book, Carl Hoffman characterized Machlin's early book as "mostly the tale of a wild-goose chase", but still important in laying the groundwork for questioning official stories of Rockefeller's disappearance The film introduces a third theory, that Rockefeller survived and was living among the locals. This theory is supported by a verbal claim of contact made by a mysterious Australian adventurer, plus a few frames of film footage showing a bearded white man among indigenous men, wearing local garb.

In 2012, Michael's surviving twin sister Mary published a memoir, titled Beginning with the End: A Memoir of Twin Loss and Healing, about coping with her grief after the death of her brother. The book was issued in paperback in 2014 as When Grief Calls Forth the Healing.

In their 2013 album The Devil Herself, band Megan Jean and the KFB features the song Tobias'' which features the lyrics "We lived amongst the tribe that ate Rockefeller / Out in Papua New Guinea I’d give you the skinny / Get eaten if I tell ya".

The chorus of Jenny Lewis's song "Hollywood Lawn" off her 2019 album On the Line features the lyrics "I'm long lost like Rockefeller / drifting off to sea."

See also
List of people who disappeared

References

External links
Asmat Art in the Michael C. Rockefeller Collection at the Metropolitan Museum of Art
Michael Rockefeller photographs on display at The Peabody Museum
Outside magazine: "Lost Scion: Was Michael Rockefeller eaten by cannibals?"
Agamemnon Films Presents: The Search for Michael Rockefeller
Television segment on Michael Rockefeller hosted by Leonard Nimoy

1938 births
1960s missing person cases
1961 deaths
Buckley School (New York City) alumni
Children of vice presidents of the United States
Clark banking family
Deaths in Indonesia
Harvard University alumni
Missing people
Missing person cases in Indonesia
People declared dead in absentia
Phillips Exeter Academy alumni
Rockefeller family
American twins
United States Army soldiers
Western New Guinea
Winthrop family
Cannibalism in Oceania